Charlotte Wrighten Placide (1776–1823), was an American actress and opera singer. She was married to Alexander Placide and mother of Jane Placide. She had a successful career from 1796, was the female star of the theatre company of Placide and the director of the Charleston Theatre in 1812–13.

References

1776 births
1823 deaths
18th-century American actresses
19th-century American actresses
American stage actresses
19th-century theatre managers
Women theatre managers and producers
19th-century American businesswomen
19th-century American businesspeople